The Singapore University of Technology and Design (SUTD) is a public autonomous university in Singapore.

History

The founding president is Thomas L. Magnanti, who is a professor associated with the Massachusetts Institute of Technology (MIT).

Campuses
SUTD's interim campus was at the former ITE College Dover campus in Dover from its founding in April 2012 until December 2014. Its permanent campus, which opened in January 2015, is located near the Changi Business Park, and is served by Upper Changi Station on the Downtown MRT Line. As of 2018, it is the only university to be located in the eastern part of Singapore. Through an open selection process, SUTD appointed DP Architects Pte. Ltd., in collaboration with UNStudio from Amsterdam, to design the academic cluster of its permanent campus in Upper Changi.

Academics

Undergraduate programmes
A four-year full-time undergraduate programme will be offered in SUTD. Students have the option to choose between five available pillars: Computer Science and Design (CSD), Engineering Product Development (EPD), Engineering Systems and Design (ESD), Architecture and Sustainable Design (ASD), and Design and Artificial Intelligence (DAI).

Graduate programmes
A two-year full-time MIT–SUTD Dual master's degree programme will be offered in collaboration with MIT to talented graduates with a keen interest in research in one of the following areas: Civil and Environmental Engineering, Supply Chain Management, or Engineering in Manufacturing. Graduate opportunities also include the SUTD PhD Programme. Candidates will spend up to one year in the United States and the other year in Singapore, receiving master's degrees from both MIT and SUTD.

With MIT, SUTD has launched joint postgraduate programmes to jump-start research at the university. The PhD programme has a strong emphasis on interdisciplinary and collaborative research and is enhanced by opportunities for industry internships, overseas research attachments, and teaching experience. The initial intake in 2012 included ten post-doctoral researchers. Post-doctorate fellows spend one year at MIT and then another year at SUTD where they conduct research and teach.

Academic pillars

Research initiatives

Design Innovation Singapore
In 2015, as part of the IDC, the Design Innovation @ Singapore (DI) platform was formed to organise and drive Design- and Technology-centred Innovation programs and initiatives for Singapore and beyond.

In 2021, the DI team was integrated with the SUTD Academy to enhance our offerings as a provider of Continuing Education and Training (CET).

SUTD–MIT International Design Centre
The International Design Centre (IDC) is based both in Singapore at SUTD, and in Cambridge, Massachusetts, at MIT, with academic and industrial partners from around the world. The IDC has more than a hundred projects that involve approximately 270 faculty, researchers and students.

IDC is part of a collaboration agreement between SUTD and MIT.

Lee Kuan Yew Centre for Innovative Cities
The Lee Kuan Yew Centre for Innovative Cities (LKY CIC) is one of the research centers in SUTD.

SUTD–JTC Industrial Infrastructure Innovation Centre
The SUTD–JTC Industrial Infrastructure Innovation (I3) Centre was set up to spearhead research efforts in design, architecture, engineering, and social science.

iTrust Research Centre
iTrust is a multidisciplinary research center which was established collaboratively by SUTD and the Ministry of Defence. The focus of iTrust is on cybersecurity. Systems of interest include large infrastructure of national importance (such as power grids, water treatment plants and oil refineries) as well as cyber-devices used in healthcare, including pacemakers, defibrillators, insulin pumps and vagus nerve stimulation implants.

O-Lab
O-Lab comprises academics and practitioners interested in understanding and enhancing design practices.

Temasek Labs at SUTD
Temasek Labs at SUTD (TL@SUTD) undertakes research and development. The current focus is on areas of defense system design and development, such as unmanned systems, information systems, soldier systems, and engineering systems.

TL@SUTD complements the work that is currently undertaken at the DSO National Laboratories, NUS, NTU, and other research establishments.

City Form Lab
The City Form Lab (CFL) is an urban design research group led by a group of architects, city planners, spatial analysts, programmers, sociologists, and artists. It was founded by Andres Sevtsuk at MIT in 2010 as the City Form Research Group, and moved to SUTD in fall 2011. The lab develops software tools for researching urban form and land use patterns.

CFL's recent projects include the open-source Urban Network Analysis Toolbox for ArcGIS, the SUTD Gridshell Pavilion, samples of urban fabric in Bugis and Punggol in Singapore, and the exhibit at the 2013 Tallinn Architecture Biennale.

References

External links

Official website of the Singapore University of Technology and Design

2012 establishments in Singapore
Changi
Educational institutions established in 2012
Education in Singapore
Autonomous Universities in Singapore